Güngören (former Teniste) is a village in the Anamur district of Mersin Province, Turkey. The population of Güngören is 555  as of 2011.

References 

Villages in Anamur District